Luigi Marchesi (8 August 1754 – 14 December 1829) was an Italian castrato singer, one of the most prominent and charismatic to appear in Europe during the second half of the eighteenth century. His singing was praised by the likes of Mozart and Napoleon.

Biography
Luigi Ludovico Marchesi was born in Milan.  He joined the Milan Cathedral choir in 1765 and made his operatic debut in Rome in 1773 at the Teatro delle Dame, cast as a female character, in Marcello da Capua's comic opera La contessina. For several years, Marchesi appeared either in minor roles or minor operatic centers, but he found a valuable ally in the Czech composer Josef Mysliveček after he appeared in the latter's opera Ezio and oratorio Isacco figura del redentore in Munich early in the year 1777.  Marchesi's singing in both productions was considered to be extraordinary.  In a letter written by Wolfgang Amadeus Mozart to his father from Munich on 11 October 1777, it is mentioned that Mysliveček bragged of his influence with the management of the Teatro San Carlo in Naples, the most prestigious venue for the performance of Italian serious opera in Europe:  he apparently had the power to recommend the engagement of singers who were to be featured in productions planned for the 1778–79 operatic season there.  Marchesi was one of the singers that Mysliveček recommended.  His first appearances in Naples were as successful as those in Munich, and they permanently established him as one of the most talented vocal artists in Italy.  In all, Mysliveček created five operatic roles for Marchesi before his premature death in 1781. His performance of Giuseppe Sarti's rondò "Mia speranza io pur vorrei" at La Scala in 1780–81 caused a sensation. After Marchesi's triumphs throughout Italy in the late 1770s and early 1780s, he ventured all the way to Vienna, St. Petersburg, and London, where he created a tremendous sensation and was proclaimed to be the greatest singer of his time. In London he was billed as Virtuoso di Camera to his Sicilian Majesty. The Earl of Mount Edgcumbe described Marchesi's impression at London as following:

Marchesi was at this time (1788) a very well-looking young man, of good figure, and graceful deportment. His acting was spirited and expressive: his vocal powers were very great, his voice of extensive compass, but a little inclined to be thick. His execution was very considerable, and he was rather too fond of displaying it; nor was his cantabile singing equal to his bravura. In recitative, and scenes of energy and passion, he was incomparable, and had he been less lavish of ornaments, which were not always appropriate, and possessed a more pure and simple taste, his performance would have been faultless: it was always striking, animated and effective. He chose for his début Sarti's beautiful opera of Giulio Sabino, in which all the songs of the principal character, and they are many and various, are of the very finest description....
He was received with rapturous applause.

In 1796 Marchesi refused to sing for Napoleon when he entered the city of Milan. For this Marchesi was honored as a national hero by the public, as reported by Vernon Lee:

The frivolous part of society chatted and danced, and adored.... the singer Marchesi whom Alfieri called upon to buckle on his helmet, and march out against the French, as the only remaining Italian who dared to resist the 'Corsican Gallis' invader, although only in the matter of song.

Marchesi's last major appearance was in Simon Mayr's Ginevra di Scozia for the inauguration of the Teatro Nuovo in Trieste (1801). He continued to appear in public for a few more years, until 1806, when he retired for good and moved to his villa at Inzago, where he died on 14 December 1829. After his retirement Marchesi did not go into obscurity; once in a while, when in good health, he used to arrange a couple of private concerts; some of them were dedicated to charity, particularly for poor orphaned children.

As an artist Marchesi was certainly one of the greatest singers of his time, and he was also a composer. In London he published his own volume set of Ariette Italiane, and also a handful of solfeggi.  He maintained a collaboration similar to that with Josef Mysliveček later in life with Angelo Tarchi.  Perhaps his most important roles in the later part of his career were Megacle in Domenico Cimarosa's L'Olimpiade and Lovinski in Simon Mayr's La Lodoiska.  Serious opera was the natural realm for his voice type, and he rarely sang comic roles after his early appearances in Rome.

In person Marchesi might have been the handsomest castrato of all time; during his London engagement in the 1790s, Maria Cosway deserted her husband and children and followed the singer around Europe for several years. Also, it is said he was adored by the whole female population of Rome. At the same time, however, Marchesi became famous for his turbulent temperament and notorious stipulations. He often insisted on making his entrance on the stage descending a hill on horseback wearing a helmet with multi-coloured plumes at least a yard high, saying "Where am I?". Otherwise, he engaged in rivalry competitions that once nearly cost him life; the fanatic supporters of the soprano Luisa Todi, his bitter rival, attempted to poison him in 1791.

Operatic Roles to 1800
Contessina Elmira in La contessina by Marcello di Capua (Rome, 1773)
Cecchina in La buona figliola by Niccolò Piccinni (Rome, 1774)
Marchesa Violante in La finta giardiniera by Pasquale Anfossi (Rome, 1774)
Gandarte in Alessandro nell'Indie by Carlo Monza (Milan, 1775)
Evandro in Medonte re di Epiro by Luigi Alessandri (Milan, 1775)
Olinto in Demetrio by Pietro Guglielmi (Venice, 1775)
Tarquinio in Il trionfo di Clelia (Munich, 1776)
Farnaspe in Adriano in Siria by Pasquale Anfossi (Padua, 1777)
Ezio in Ezio by Josef Mysliveček (Munich, 1777)
Tarsile in La Calliroe by Josef Mysliveček (Naples, 1778)
Aminta in Il re pastore by Ignazio Platania (Naples, 1778)
Megacle in L'Olimpiade by Josef Mysliveček (Naples, 1778)
Achille in Ifigenia in Aulide by Vicente Martín y Soler (Naples, 1779)
Ulisse in La Circe by Josef Mysliveček (Venice, 1779)
Achille in Achille in Sciro by Giuseppe Sarti (Florence, 1779)
Castore in Castore e Polluce by Francesco Bianchi (Florence, 1779)
Rinaldo in Armida by Josef Mysliveček (Milan, 1780)
Timante in Demofoonte (Pisa, 1780)
Linceo in L'Ipermestra by Vicente Martín y Soler (Naples, 1780)
Rinaldo in Armida abbandonata by Niccolò Jommelli (Naples, 1780)
Amore in Amore e Psiche by Joseph Schuster (Naples, 1780)
Arbace in Arbace by Francesco Bianchi (Naples, 1781)
Timante in Demofoonte (Genoa, 1781)
Adone in Venere e Adone by Francesco Bianchi (Florence, 1781)
Giulio Sabino in Giulio Sabino by Giuseppe Sarti (Florence, 1781; Vienna, 1785; London, 1788)
Ezio in Ezio by Felice Alessandri (Milan, Alessandria, and Lucca, 1782; Florence, 1783)
Megacle in L'Olimpiade by Francesco Bianchi (Milan, 1782)
Ciro in Il trionfo della pace by Francesco Bianchi (Turin, 1782)
Timante in Demofoonte (Lucca, 1782)
Arbace in Artaserse by Giacomo Rust (Rome, 1783)
Quinto Fabio in Quinto Fabio by Luigi Cherubini (Rome, 1783)
Timante in Demofoonte by Felice Alessandri (Padua, 1783)
Arsace in Medonte, re di Epiro by Giuseppe Sarti (Senigallia, 1783)
Piramo in Piramo e Tisbe by Giovanni Battista Borghi (Florence, 1783)
Aspard in Aspard by Francesco Bianchi (Rome, 1784)
Megacle in L'Olimpiade by Giuseppe Sarti (Rome, 1784)
Poro in Alessandro nell'Indie by Luigi Cherubini (Mantua, 1784)
Rinaldo in Armida e Rinaldo by Giuseppe Sarti (St. Petersburg, 1786)
Castore in Castore e Polluce by Giuseppe Sarti (St. Petersburg, 1786)
Megacle in L'Olimpiade by Domenico Cimarosa (Vicenza and Lucca, 1784; London and Milan, 1788; Venice, 1790; Livorno, 1791; Modena, 1795)
Achille in Achille in Sciro by Gaetano Pugnani (Turin, 1785)
Arbace in Artaserse (Turin, 1785)
Arminio in Arminio by Angelo Tarchi (Mantua, 1785)
Castore in Castore e Polluce by Giuseppe Sarti (St. Petersburg, 1786)
Ramiro in Il conte di Saldagna by Angelo Tarchi (Milan, 1787)
Timante in Demofoonte by Gaetano Pugnani (Turin, 1788)
Achille in Ifigenia in Aulide by Luigi Cherubini (Turin and Milan, 1788; London, 1789)
Gualtieri in Il disertore by Angelo Tarchi (London, 1789; Siena, 1791; Vicenza, 1794; Genoa, 1799)
Porus in La generosità d'Alessandro by Angelo Tarchi (London, 1789)
Pyrrhus in Andromaca by Sebastiano Nasolini (London, 1790)
Timante in L'usurpator innocente by Vincenzo Federici (London, 1790)
Giulio Sabino in Giulio Sabino by Angelo Tarchi (Turin, 1790)
Megacle in L'Olimpiade by Vincenzo Federici (Turin, 1790)
Medoro in Angelica e Medoro by Ferdinando Bertoni (Venice, 1791)
Ercole in L'apoteosi d'Ercole by Angelo Tarchi (Venice, 1791)
Timante in Demofoonte (Venice and Livorno, 1791)
Poro in Alessandro nell'Indie by Angelo Tarchi (Livorno, 1791)
Learco in Adrasto re d'Egitto by Angelo Tarchi (Milan, 1792)
Pirro in Pirro re di Epiro by Niccolò Antonio Zingarelli (Milan, 1792; Venice and Bergamo, 1793; Vicenza, 1794; Venice, 1795; Faenza, 1796; Livorno, 1798)
Ezio in Ezio by Angelo Tarchi (Vicenza, 1792)
Arbace in Artaserse by Niccolò Antonio Zingarelli (Milan, 1794)
Timante in Demofoonte by Marcos Portugal (Milan, 1794)
Achille in Achille in Sciro by Marcello Bernardini (Venice, 1794)
Ramiro in Il conte di Saldagna by Niccolò Antonio Zingarelli (Venice and Reggio Emilia, 1795; Venice and Livorno, 1798)
Achille in Ifigenia in Aulide by Niccolò Antonio Zingarelli (Venice, 1795)
Arbace in Artaserse by Giuseppe Nicolini (Venice, 1795)
Timante in Demofoonte (Venice, 1795)
Lovinski in La Lodoiska by Simon Mayr (Venice, Faenza, and Senigallia, 1796; Venice and Genoa, 1797; Livorno, 1798, Genoa, 1799; Milan, 1800)
Lovinski in a pasticcio of La Lodoiska (Lisbon, 1796)
Lauso in Lauso e Lidia by Simon Mayr (Venice, 1798)
Mexicow in Carolina e Mexicow by Gaetano Rossi (Venice, 1798)
Tito in Bruto by Giuseppe Nicolini (Genoa, 1799)
Idante in Idante by Marcos Portugal (Milan, 1800)

References
Notes

Sources
Heriot, Angus (1956), The Castrati in Opera, London.
Sadie, Stanley (ed.) 1998, The New Grove Dictionary of Music and Musicians.
Sartori, Claudio (1992–94),  I libretti italiani a stampa dalle origini al 1800.  Cuneo.

1754 births
1829 deaths
Singers from Milan
Castrati
18th-century Italian male actors
Italian male stage actors
18th-century Italian male opera singers